A traditional speciality guaranteed (TSG, plural: traditional specialities guaranteed) is a traditional food product protected under European Union and/or UK law. This label differs from the geographical indications protected designation of origin (PDO) and protected geographical indication (PGI) in that the TSG label does not certify that the protected food product has a link to a specific geographical area, and thus a product can be produced outside the area or country from which it originates.

To qualify for the TSG label, a food must be of "specific character" and its raw materials, production method, or processing must be "traditional". Title III of European Union Regulation 1151/2012 (Articles 17-26) deals with the TSG scheme, with specific terms defined in Article 3: "specific character" is defined as "the characteristic production attributes which distinguish a product clearly from other similar products of the same category", and "traditional" is defined as "proven usage on the domestic market for a period that allows transmission between generations; this period is to be at least 30 years".

For a food name to be registrable under the TSG scheme it must (a) have been traditionally used to refer to the specific product or (b) identify the traditional character or specific character of the product.

A TSG creates an exclusive right over the registered product name. Accordingly, the registered product name can be used by only those producers who conform to the registered production method and product specifications.

"The legal function of the TSG is to certify that a particular agricultural product objectively possesses specific characteristics which differentiate it from all others in its category, and that its raw materials, composition or method of production have been consistent for a minimum of 30 years. Thus, TSG food denominations are registered trade signs with a distinctive function."

Use of geographical indications in TSG
Some TSG designations require the use of products with a protected designation of origin, protected geographical indication, or another traditional speciality guaranteed for their preparation.
Pizza Napoletana requires the use of either the PDO mozzarella di bufala campana (made from buffalo) or the TSG mozzarella.  
Berthoud, which is a dish created from molten PDO cheese abondance, the PDO wine vin de Savoie, as well as either the PDO fortified wines madeira or port.
Vincisgrassi alla maceratese is a baked pasta finished with the PDO Parmigiano Reggiano or Grana Padano.

Lists of TSG products by country 

All 64 TSG registered before 1 January 2021 in the EU are also protected in the UK. As of 18 April 2021, 65 TSG have been registered (see list) in the UK and 69 in the EU, all of which originate from the EU or the UK. The distribution by country of application is shown below:

References

European Union food law
Food law
Food product brands
Geographical indications law of the European Union
Traditional Speciality Guaranteed